U.B. Funkeys is a personal computer game and collectible figure set created by Mattel. It was created in 2007 until discontinuation of the toys in the United States in 2010. Play consisted of a personal computer game that worked together with collectible figures that represent characters in the game. There are over 45 different "species" of Funkeys. Most Funkeys come in three different types of styles which are normal, rare, and very rare.

Gameplay involves players placing figures in the hub, (A special USB unit shaped to look like a larger version of the small figures) which in turn appear in the game. Each figure, when connected to the hub, allows players to unlock new areas of the game. The hub is purchased in a starter pack with two to four of the collectible figures. It is required to play the game. It began in August, 2007 and ended in January, 2010. The product was exhibited by Mattel in February 2007 at the American International Toy Fair and designed by Radica Games. The game software was developed by Arkadium.

Description 
Funkeys are characters that inhabit a virtual world called Terrapinia. Players navigate a number of zones and portals where they play games to earn coins. With their coins they can buy items to decorate their homes, referred to as "cribs" in the game.

Users progress through the game as they collect different figures. Each "tribe" is able to access different areas, games and items. Most figures have two sets of alternate colors, and using these "Rare" or "Very Rare" Funkeys gives the player access to more items inside of their respective shops.

There are many portals to go through: Kelpy Basin, Magma Gorge, Laputta Station, Funkiki Island, Daydream Oasis, Nightmare Rift, Royalton Raceway, Hidden Realm, and Paradox Green. In order to use a portal, the player had to use a Funkey with a game room in the given location. For example, Sol can access Funkiki Island because its game room, "Relaxation Resort," is located there. However, Sol cannot access Lapuatta Station because there is no game room there it can access. Regardless of tribe, any Funkey can return to Funkeystown.*

In every zone, there is an enemy character who appears if the player stays outside for too long. These are: Henchmen in Funkeystown, Magma Gorge, Lapuatta Station, and Kelpy Basin; Natives on Funkiki Island; Dali in Daydream Oasis; Goya in Nightmare Rift; Kane in the Hidden Realm; and the Henchmen 2.0 in Paradox Green. Encountering these characters will start a short minigame where the player can win or lose coins.

Throughout the game, the player hears of Master Lox, the main antagonist of the series. He locked the portals and game rooms, restricting access only for particular Funkeys. In addition, he created the Henchmen to steal coins in Funkeystown, Kelpy Basin, Magma Gorge, and Laputta Station and the Henchman 2.0 in Paradox Green to destroy the Gnomon Tree. He also appears to be served by Dali and Goya.

There was also a series of Wendy's Kids meal toys. Some of them include a Bobblehead, A backpack clip, A 3D board game and 2 CDs that have prototypes of the game.

Exceptions: Jerry, Native, Pineapple King.

Sets
The series spawned many various sets, which were available throughout the series' lifespan. These were single Funkeys, starter packs, adventure packs, Multiplayer sets, chat sets, and limited edition packs.

Starter Packs
Starter packs contain a white hub, installation disk, and instruction booklet. In general, each contained two to four funkeys relating to a particular world. The white hub design would change in some packs to reflect the new worlds. For instance, hubs made during the Dream State run have a chest with purple wisps on them.

Adventure Packs
During the series' lifespan, there were a number of adventure packs released. These contained several Funkeys from the same world that were of the same rarity. (i.e. all four would be Normal/Rare/Very Rare) Sometimes these Funkeys would be bundled together in starter packs, as well.

Chat/Multiplayer Packs
Several games from the Dream States and on offer multiplayer functionalities. These Funkeys would be bundled with one extra Funkey as a minor bonus (like adventure packs, both Funkeys are of the same rarity). Similarly, Chat Funkeys (who offer a chat room in place of a game) are bundled in with a bonus Funkey. Since all chat Funkeys are of Normal rarity, the bundled Funkey is, as well.

Limited Edition Packs
Limited edition packs were created that came with Funkeys that the player could not normally use. This included the Funkeystown adventure pack, and the Funkiki Island pack. A Dream State pack was also in coming, but was never officially released. 
The Funkeystown pack came with a Henchmen figure, a Master Lox figure, and the Mayor Sayso figure. Lox and the Henchman offered access to the Villain's Den, a shop-less game room in Funkeystown with a coin-related game. Mayor Sayso was able to access any game room in the original game, but cannot play any of the games.

The Funkiki Island pack came with Jerry, a Funkiki native, and the Pineapple King, along with a Normal Sol figure. In a similar fashion to the Funkeystown Adventure Pack, Jerry can access any game room but cannot play games, and the Native and Pineapple King can access the Funkiki Native Outpost.

References

External links 
 Case Studies: U.B. Funkeys Arkadium's involvement
 Link to v4.8 update and other information found by Leon Barnes

Mattel games
Video game hardware
Multiplayer and single-player video games
Collectible miniatures games
Video games that use figurines
Toys-to-life games
2007 video games